Marie-Antoinette Maupertuis, also called Nanette Maupertuis, is a French politician and academic practicing in Corsica.

Elected councilor to the Corsican assembly on Gilles Simeoni's list in the 2015 elections, she was re-elected in 2017 and 2021. She was elected president of the deliberative body of the Corsican community following the 2021 election.

Biography

Personal items and career 
Marie-Antoinette Maupertuis, known as "Nanette", followed university training in economics, which she suspended to exercise the function of parliamentary attaché to Max Simeoni in Brussels.

In 2016, she was professor of economics at the University of Corsica and there directed the research laboratory in human and social sciences of the National Centre for Scientific Research.

Political career 
Number two on Gilles Simeoni's list (Femu a Corsica), she was elected councilor to the Corsican assembly following the 2015 election. However, during the installation session of the mandate held on December 17, 2015, she was appointed member of the Corsican executive council under the direction of Gilles Simeoni. She was entrusted with the presidency of the Corsica Tourism Agency (ATC) as well as the field of European affairs.

In view of the election of the Corsican assembly of December 2017, Marie-Antoinette Maupertuis is once again second on Gilles Simeoni's list, this time led as part of the Pè a Corsica coalition bringing together autonomists and nationalists. She was elected a few weeks before the creation of the collectivity of Corsica on 1st January 2018, resulting from the merger of the departments of Corse-du-Sud and Haute-Corse with the territorial community of Corsica. Her portfolio remained associated with the management of ATC, but it expands to European and international affairs, public innovation policy and the smart specialization strategy.

Unlike the previous election, the autonomists and the nationalists did not form a coalition in the Corsican assembly elections in 2021. Also, coming first in the first and second rounds, Gilles Simeoni's “Fà populu inseme” list obtained the absolute majority in the Assembly with 32 of the 63 seats. Under this new mandate, she was elected president of the Corsican assembly by her peers on the day of her installation, on 1st July 2021.

References 

1967 births
Living people
Corsican politicians
Corsican Assembly
Presidents of the Corsican Assembly
Members of the Corsican Assembly
Femu a Corsica politicians
Corsican women in politics
Regional councillors of France
21st-century French politicians
21st-century French women politicians